Soma Dey (born 1947) is an Indian actress who is known for her work in Bengali cinema. She is best known for her role as Chintamani in Govinda Ray's Bilwamangal (1976).

Soma Dey made her big screen debut with Haraye Khunji (1974) and subsequently appeared in films such as Janmabhumi (1974), Bilwamangal (1976), Bondi Bidhata (1976), Shankhabish (1976), Sudur Niharika (1976) and Barbadhu (1978).

Career
Soma Dey made her big screen debut with Swadesh Sarkar's Haraye Khunji (1976). In the same year she starred in Piyush Kanti Ganguly's Janmabhumi (1974). She was  Bilwamangal (1976) and Byapika Biday (1980) gave her prominence.

Filmography

TV shows

References

Living people
1947 births
20th-century Indian actresses